The 2008–09 LNAH season was the 13th season of the Ligue Nord-Américaine de Hockey (before 2004 the Quebec Semi-Pro Hockey League), a minor professional league in the Canadian province of Quebec. Nine teams participated in the regular season, and Lois Jeans de Pont-Rouge won the league title.

Regular season

Coupe Futura-Playoffs 
Won by Lois Jeans de Pont-Rouge.

External links 
 Statistics on hockeydb.com

Ligue Nord-Américaine de Hockey seasons
3